The Baileys of Balboa is an American sitcom that appeared on CBS in the 1964–1965 season on Thursdays at 9:30pm ET. The series lasted only one 26-episode season. The show was directed by Gary Nelson and Bob Sweeney.

The show was primarily developed for the network because its president, James T. Aubrey, insisted that Gilligan's Island, which premiered the same season (and which he personally loathed), would have been a better show if it had centered on the exploits of a charter boat captain operating in a marina, and had his old friend Keefe Brasselle produce his version of the idea in order to prove his point.

After Aubrey was fired from the network in February 1965 (amid charges of "conflict of interest" in scheduling the show and two other Brasselle productions without formal pilot episodes), The Baileys of Balboa fulfilled its 26-episode commitment, and was abruptly canceleddue, in part, to its poor ratings opposite ABC's highly successful twice-weekly soap opera, Peyton Place. Gilligan's Island continued for two more seasons.

Overview
The plot follows the Bailey family, who live at a beach resort, where Sam Bailey operates a charter boat at the local marina. The Baileys regularly get into conflicts with their wealthier neighbors. The show starred Paul Ford (Sam Bailey), Sterling Holloway (Buck Singleton), John Dehner (Commodore Cecil Wyntoon), Judy Carne (Barbara Wyntoon), Les Brown, Jr. (Jim Bailey), Clint Howard (Stanley), Howard Freeman (Langley) and Dorothy Green. John Banner also occasionally appeared as "Hans".

Among the guest stars on The Baileys of Balboa was Roger Ewing, in the December 1964 episode "Look Who's A Sailor", and later played Thaddeus "Thad" Greenwood in CBS's western series, Gunsmoke, from 1965 to 1967. Child actor Kelly Corcoran, then 6 years old, made his third ever screen appearance in the February 1965 episode "The Education Of Sam Bailey".

Episode list

References

External links
 

CBS original programming
English-language television shows
1960s American sitcoms
1964 American television series debuts
1965 American television series endings
Television series by CBS Studios